Johann-Henrich Karl Daniel "Jo" Krummacher (27 December 1947 – 25 February 2008) was a German politician from the Christian Democratic Union.

Early life 
He was born in Heidelberg. He was a Protestant clergyman.

Politics 
In the 2005 German federal election, he was elected Member of the German Bundestag for the Stuttgart I constituency.

References

See also 

 List of members of the 16th Bundestag

1947 births
2008 deaths
Members of the Bundestag 2005–2009
Members of the Bundestag for the Christian Democratic Union of Germany
Members of the Bundestag for Baden-Württemberg
21st-century German politicians

Evangelical-Lutheran Church in Württemberg
20th-century German Protestant theologians
20th-century Protestant religious leaders
Politicians from Heidelberg
20th-century German journalists
21st-century German journalists